The Nagoya Dome (ナゴヤドーム),  known as Vantelin Dome Nagoya (バンテリンドーム ナゴヤ) for sponsoring reasons, is a baseball field, constructed in 1997, located in the city of Nagoya, Japan. The dome has the capacity to seat up to 40,500 for sports and 49,000 for concerts. It is an example of a geodesic dome.

It has served as HQ for the Chunichi Dragons baseball team, since its opening. It has also served baseball teams Orix BlueWave and Kintetsu Buffaloes, sometimes during the year.

Official theme song for The Nagoya Dome, "Here For You", was written by local FM radio disk jockey, James Havens, and also released on CD by Victor Entertainment.

Shopping center
ÆON MALL NAGOYADOMEMAE DragonsShop

Access
Nagoya Municipal Subway Meijō Line, Nagoya GuideWay-Bus Yutorito Line
Nagoya Dome-mae Yada Station
Meitetsu Seto Line
Yada Station
Central Japan Railway Company Chūō Main Line, Meitetsu Seto Line, Nagoya Municipal Subway Meijō Line, Nagoya GuideWay-Bus Yutorito Line
Ōzone Station

See also
Diagrid
Thin-shell structure
List of thin shell structures

References

Sources
Takenaka Corporation web page on the construction of the Nagoya Dome

External links 
Nagoya Dome website

 

Sports venues completed in 1997
Sports venues in Nagoya
Covered stadiums in Japan
Nippon Professional Baseball venues
Geodesic domes
High-tech architecture
Chunichi Dragons
1997 establishments in Japan